The Demi World Tour was the fourth headlining concert tour and second worldwide tour by American singer Demi Lovato. It was her second tour in support of her fourth studio album Demi (2013), following The Neon Lights Tour. During most of the European tour dates in 2014 (except for Istanbul), Lovato was the opening act for Enrique Iglesias' Sex and Love Tour. The tour was produced and promoted by Live Nation, and sponsored by the Tampax and Always Radiant Collection. The first leg of the tour took place in the United States and Canada from September 6, 2014, to October 27, 2014, when Christina Perri and MKTO were the opening acts. Lovato toured Oceania and Asia in early 2015.

Background and development 
On May 28, 2014, a video was published on Lovato's YouTube channel with the text "Tomorrow 10:00 am PST" in a fuchsia color fading in on a white background, followed by a link to her website, while a screaming crowd can be heard in the background. The next day, the Demi World Tour was announced along with the North American dates on Lovato's website, as well as a video on her YouTube channel. Christina Perri and American music duo MKTO were revealed to be serving as opening acts for the North American leg of the tour. Tickets for the tour were made available on June 6, 2014, with the tour set to begin on September 6, 2014. On June 19, 2014, Lovato announced her first-ever date at the Staples Center in Los Angeles.
Comparing the show to The Neon Lights Tour, Lovato said, "The Neon Lights Tour was amazing and I had so much fun, but I'm constantly thinking, 'How can I step up my game and how can I take my shows to the next level?' so that's what we're doing with this tour, I'm changing some of the songs, adding new songs, adding new covers. I just want it to be fun and I want it to be everything that I didn't get to do with the Neon Lights Tour."

Promotion 

On April 28, 2014, Lovato announced a partnership with Shazam. The promotion asked European fans to tag the song "Neon Lights" on Shazam, and this information would be used to book her European tour dates. It allowed fans to play a significant part in where her shows would be played. Regarding the partnership, Shazam's head of music said, "This is a fantastic way for Shazam to help Demi Lovato fans across Europe easily cast their vote to have [them] play in a city near them." Lovato made appearances on Late Night with Seth Meyers on June 4, 2014, and Good Morning America as part of their Summer Concert Series on June 6, 2014, to promote the Demi World Tour.

Set list 
This set list is from the show on October 25, 2014. It is not intended to represent of all concerts for the duration of the tour.

"Really Don't Care"
"The Middle"
"Fire Starter"
"Remember December"
"Heart Attack"
"My Love is Like a Star"
"Don't Forget" 
"Catch Me"
"Let It Go"
"Warrior"
"Two Pieces"
"Thriller" (Michael Jackson cover)
"Got Dynamite"
"Nightingale"
"Skyscraper"
"Give Your Heart a Break"
Encore
"Neon Lights"

Tour dates

Selected box office data

Cancelled show

Notes

References 

2014 concert tours
2015 concert tours
Demi Lovato concert tours